The Bayfield 29 is a Canadian sailboat that was designed by Ted Gozzard as a cruiser and first built in 1978.

Production
The design was built by the Bayfield Boat Yard in Canada from 1978 to 1983, with 350 boats completed, but it is now out of production.

Design
The Bayfield 29 is a recreational keelboat, built predominantly of fibreglass, with wood trim. It has a cutter rig with anodized aluminum spars, a clipper bow, a conventional transom, a keel-mounted rudder controlled by a tiller, or optional Edson wheel, and a fixed long keel. The design has no provisions for a spinnaker and has been noted as having a small cockpit.

The design has sleeping accommodation for five people, with two straight settees in the main cabin, one of which converts to a double and two quarter berths aft, one on each side. Unconventionally there is no bow "V" berth and instead the bow is occupied by a large head, instead. The galley is located on the starboard side just forward of the companionway ladder. The galley is "L"-shaped and is equipped with a two-burner alcohol-fired stove, an icebox and a stainless steel sink. A navigation station is opposite the galley, on the port side. The cabin is an open plan design, but has wooden panels built into the gallery counter and the chart table, that can be raised for privacy. The interior was delivered with unfinished teak.

The design has a PHRF-LO racing average handicap of 213.

Operational history
A review in Canadian Yachting from May 1985, just after production ended, by Carol Nickle & Bryan Gooderham stated, "The 29 is as traditional in appearance as a fibreglass production yacht can be. Its springy sheer line concludes forward in a bowsprit/platform; the silhouette is high; the underwater shape features a deep forefoot and a long, full keel with rudder attached; and the modest sail area is distributed in a cutter rig, with no provision for a spinnaker. The bow sections are fairly full, and the beam compares with those of some larger performance-oriented yachts." They concluded, "in summary, we found the Bayfield 29 to be a comfortable, sturdy design with oceangoing capability, appealing most to the cruising couple or the single-handed sailor."

In a review Michael McGoldrick wrote, "the Bayfield 29 has a full keel, cutter rig (two head sails), a shallow draft, and a built-in bowsprit (complete with stylized wooden trail boards on either side of its bow). It is an out-and-out cruising boat, and like its smaller counterpart, the Bayfield 25, it only starts to come alive when the winds picks up ... Two points about the Bayfield 29 - it has a relatively small cockpit, and if you don't count the bowsprit, its hull length is more like 27.5 to 28 feet."

See also
List of sailing boat types

Similar sailboats
Alberg 29
C&C 29
Cal 29
Hunter 290
Island Packet 29
Mirage 29
Northwind 29
Prospect 900
Tanzer 29
Thames Marine Mirage 29
Watkins 29

References

Keelboats
Dinghies
1970s sailboat type designs
Sailing yachts
Sailboat type designs by Ted Gozzard
Sailboat types built by Bayfield Boat Yard